is a Japanese Nippon Professional Baseball player. Since becoming a professional in 2008, he has played with the Yomiuri Giants in Japan's Central League.

External links

Living people
1985 births
Baseball people from Nara Prefecture
Japanese baseball players
Nippon Professional Baseball outfielders
Yomiuri Giants players